In the United States, federal public defender organizations are entities in the United States Federal Government, and their staffs are federal employees. Federal public defenders handle criminal trials in United States Federal Court for alleged federal crimes or criminal cases involving state law violations in which a federal court can assert federal jurisdiction.

History
The Sixth Amendment to the United States Constitution as interpreted by the United States Supreme Court guarantees a criminal defendant the right to representation by an attorney in serious criminal prosecutions.

Organization
There are two types of federal defender organizations: federal public defender organizations and community defender organizations. There are 81 authorized federal defender organizations. These organizations employ more than 3,100 lawyers, investigators, paralegals, and support personnel and serve 91 of the 94 federal judicial districts.

Chief federal public defender
The chief federal public defender is appointed to a four-year term by the United States courts of appeals of the circuit in which the defender organization is located. The United States Congress placed this appointment authority in the United States courts of appeals rather than with the United States district court in order to insulate federal public defenders from the involvement of the court before which the defender principally practices.

Quality
In a 2011 survey, Richard Posner and Albert Loon found that federal judges perceived federal public defenders as providing higher quality representation than either privately retained counsel or attorneys appointed under the Criminal Justice Act.

Salaries
By law, lawyers employed by Federal Public Defender offices have salaries set to match those of lawyers in the U.S. Attorney's office. The combination of salary, benefits and support team tends to attract, and more importantly retain, highly qualified attorneys. Especially in more rural areas, where federal criminal work is considered well-paid, many federal defenders have risen up through the state systems before becoming federal defenders.

Case load
In 2014, the United States Sentencing Commission reported that there were 75,998 federal criminal cases in which an offender was sentenced in United States federal court.

Notable federal public defenders

 Candace Jackson-Akiwumi
 Arenda Wright Allen
 Jesus Bernal
 Richard F. Boulware
 James K. Bredar
 Beth Brinkmann
 Judy Clarke
 Rich Curtner
 Frank Dunham Jr.
 Thomas Fleener
 Mary Barzee Flores
 Mary French
 Gustavo Gelpí
 Ketanji Brown Jackson
 Jane Louise Kelly
 Larry Krasner
 Ellen Leonida
 Marina Marmolejo
 Rosemary Márquez
 Mary S. McElroy
 Raymond P. Moore
 Federico A. Moreno
 Thomas W. Murphy
 Alan J. Pfeuffer
 Edward C. Prado
 Mark Reichel
 Esther Salas
 Jon Sands
 Leo T. Sorokin
 William L. Thomas
 John Van de Kamp
 Jeffrey L. Viken
 Ayelet Waldman
 Steven T. Wax
 James D. Whittemore
 Kathleen M. Williams
 Paula Xinis
 Frank R. Zapata
 Gerald Zerkin

References

External links
 Case Weights for Federal Defender Organizations
 Faces of the Judiciary - The Role of a Federal Defender

Criminal defense organizations
Federal government of the United States
Lawyers by type
United States criminal procedure
Public defenders